Cesare Cutolo (1826-1867) was an Italian-Australian composer of romantic music. His Magnum Opus was a Victorian Christmas Waltz. He was killed in a boating accident. A memorial concert was held in his name on 21 February 1867 with proceeds collected to present to his wife.

Works
 The Victorian Christmas waltz 
 Song of the volunteers with words by H. E. Smith 
 Remembrances of the Pyramids : nocturne / by C. Cutolo
 Come where my love lies dreaming 
 Hail fair Australia / words by Ellie ; music by Cutolo
 March and Chorus
 Oh, Gently breathe with lyrics by J. R. Thomas

Recordings
 The Victorian Christmas waltz, arranged by Richard Divall  in Australia unite! : the road to Federation : songs and dances of colonial Australia. OCLC Number: 224672714

References

Australian conductors (music)
19th-century Australian musicians
Australian male classical composers
19th-century male musicians
19th-century musicians
Australian
European Australian
Cesare Cutolo
1867 deaths
Australian male composers
19th-century classical composers
People from Melbourne
Australian people of Italian descent
Immigration to Australia
Music